Environmental policy is the commitment of an organization or government to the laws, regulations, and other policy mechanisms concerning environmental issues. These issues generally include air and water pollution, waste management, ecosystem management, maintenance of biodiversity, the management of natural resources, wildlife and endangered species.
For example, concerning environmental policy, the implementation of an eco-energy-oriented policy at a global level to address the issues of global warming and climate changes could be addressed.
Policies concerning energy or regulation of toxic substances including pesticides and many types of industrial waste are part of the topic of environmental policy. This policy can be deliberately taken to influence human activities and thereby prevent undesirable effects on the biophysical environment and natural resources, as well as to make sure that changes in the environment do not have unacceptable effects on humans.

Definition
One way is to describe environmental policy is that it comprises two major terms: environment and policy. Environment refers to the physical ecosystems, but can also take into consideration the social dimension (quality of life, health) and an economic dimension (resource management, biodiversity). Policy can be defined as a "course of action or principle adopted or proposed by a government, party, business or individual". Thus, environmental policy tends to focus on problems arising from human impact on the environment, which is important to human society by having a (negative) impact on human values.  Such human values are often labeled as good health or the 'clean and green' environment.  In practice, policy analysts provide a wide variety of types of information to the public decision making process.

Environmental issues typically addressed by environmental policy include (but are not limited to) air and water pollution, waste management, ecosystem management, biodiversity protection, the protection of natural resources, wildlife and endangered species, and the management of these natural resources for future generations. Relatively recently, environmental policy has also attended to the communication of environmental issues.  In contrast to environmental policy, ecological policy addresses issues that focus on achieving benefits (both monetary and non monetary) from the non human ecological world.  Broadly included in ecological policy is natural resource management (fisheries, forestry, wildlife, range, biodiversity, and at-risk species).  This specialized area of policy possesses its own distinctive features.

Rationale
The rationale for governmental involvement in the environment is often attributed to market failure in the form of forces beyond the control of one person, including the free rider problem and the tragedy of the commons. An example of an externality is when a factory produces waste pollution which may be discharged into a river, ultimately contaminating water. The cost of such action is paid by society-at-large when they must clean the water before drinking it and is external to the costs of the polluter. The free rider problem occurs when the private marginal cost of taking action to protect the environment is greater than the private marginal benefit, but the social marginal cost is less than the social marginal benefit. The tragedy of the commons is the condition that, because no one person owns the commons, each individual has an incentive to utilize common resources as much as possible. Without governmental involvement, the commons is overused.  Examples of tragedies of the commons are overfishing and overgrazing.

The role of Non-Governmental Organizations 
Non-Governmental organizations have the greatest influence on environmental policies. These days, many countries are facing huge environmental, social, and economic impacts of rapid population growth, development, and natural resource constraints. As NGOs try to help countries to tackle these issues more successfully, a lack of understanding about their role in civil society and the public perception that the government alone is responsible for the well-being of its citizens and residents makes NGOs tasks more difficult to achieve. 
NGOs such as Greenpeace and World Wildlife Fund can help tackling issues by conducting research to facilitate policy development, building institutional capacity, and facilitating independent dialogue with civil society to help people live more sustainable lifestyles. The need for a legal framework to recognize NGOs and enable them to access more diverse funding sources, high-level support/endorsement from local figureheads, and engaging NGOs in policy development and implementation is more important as environmental issues continue to increase.

International organizations have also made great impacts on environmental policies by creating programmes such as the United Nations Environment Programme and hosting conferences such as the United Nations Earth Summit to address environmental issues. UNEP is the leading global environmental authority tasked with policy guidance for environmental programs. The UNEP monitors environmental aspects, such as waste management, energy use, greenhouse gas inventory, and water use to promote environmental sustainability and address environmental issues.

Instruments, problems, and issues
Environmental policy instruments are tools used by governments and other organizations to implement their environmental policies. Governments, for example, may use a number of different types of instruments. For example, economic incentives and market-based instruments such as taxes and tax exemptions, tradable permits, and fees can be very effective to encourage compliance with environmental policy. The assumption is that corporations and other organizations who engage in efficient environmental management and are transparent about their environmental data and reporting presumably benefit from improved business and organizational performance.

Bilateral agreements between the government and private firms and commitments made by firms independent of government requirement are examples of voluntary environmental measures. Another instrument is the implementation of greener public purchasing programs.

Several instruments are sometimes combined in a policy mix to address a particular environmental problem. Since environmental issues have many aspects, several policy instruments may be required to adequately address each one. Furthermore, a combination of different policies may give firms greater flexibility in policy compliance and reduce uncertainty as to the cost of such compliance.

Ideally, government policies are to be carefully formulated so that the individual measures do not undermine one another, or create a rigid and cost-ineffective framework. Overlapping policies result in unnecessary administrative costs, increasing the cost of implementation. To help governments realize their policy goals, the OECD Environment Directorate, for example, collects data on the efficiency and consequences of environmental policies implemented by the national governments. The website, www.economicinstruments.com,   provides database detailing countries' experiences with their environmental policies. The United Nations Economic Commission for Europe, through UNECE Environmental Performance Reviews, evaluates progress made by its member countries in improving their environmental policies.

The current reliance on a market-based framework has supporters and detractors.  Among the detractors for example, some environmentalists contend that a more radical, overarching approach is needed than a set of specific initiatives, to deal with climate change. For example, energy efficiency measures may actually increase energy consumption in the absence of a cap on fossil fuel use, as people might drive more fuel-efficient cars. To combat this result, Aubrey Meyer calls for a 'framework-based market' of contraction and convergence. The Cap and Share and the Sky Trust are proposals based on the idea.

Environmental impact assessments (EIA) are conducted to compare impacts of various policy alternatives. Moreover, although it is often assumed that policymakers make rational decisions based on the merits of the project, Eccleston and March argue that although policymakers normally have access to reasonably accurate environmental information, political and economic factors are important and often lead to policy decisions that rank environmental priorities of secondary importance.

The decision-making theory casts doubt on this premise. Irrational decisions are reached based on unconscious biases, illogical assumptions, and the desire to avoid ambiguity and uncertainty.

Eccleston identifies and describes four of the most critical environmental policy issues facing humanity: water scarcity, food scarcity, climate change, and the population paradox.

Research and innovation policy
Synergic to the environmental policy is the environmental research and innovation policy. An example is the European environmental research and innovation policy, which aims at defining and implementing a transformative agenda to greening the economy and the society as a whole so to achieve a truly sustainable development. Europe is particularly active in this field, via a set of strategies, actions and programmes to promote more and better research and innovation for building a resource-efficient, climate resilient society and thriving economy in sync with its natural environment. Research and innovation in Europe are financially supported by the programme Horizon 2020, which is also open to participation worldwide.

UNFCCC research shows that climate-related projects and policies that involve women are more effective. Policies, projects and investments without meaningful participation by women are less effective and often increase existing gender inequalities. Women's found climate solutions that cross political or ethnic boundaries have been particularly important in regions where entire ecosystems are under threat, e.g. small island states, the Arctic and the Amazon and in areas where people's livelihoods depend on natural resources e.g. fishing, farming and forestry.

History
Though the Clean Air Act 1956 in response to London's Great Smog of 1952 was a historical step forward, and the 1955 Air Pollution Control Act was the first U.S. federal legislation that pertained to air pollution, the 1960s marked the beginning of modern environmental policy making. The stage had been set for change by the publication of Rachel Carson's New York Times bestseller Silent Spring in 1962 and strengthened the Environmental movement. Earth Day founder Gaylord Nelson, then a U.S. Senator from Wisconsin, after witnessing the ravages of the 1969 massive oil spill in Santa Barbara, California, became famous for his environmental work. Administrator Ruckelshaus was confirmed by the Senate on December 2, 1970, which is the traditional date used as the birth of the United States Environmental Protection Agency (EPA). Five months earlier, in July 1970, President Nixon had signed Reorganization Plan No. 3 calling for the establishment of EPA. At the time, Environmental Policy was a bipartisan issue and the efforts of the United States of America helped spark countries around the world to create environmental policies. During this period, legislation was passed to regulate pollutants that go into the air, water tables, and solid waste disposal. President Nixon signed the Clean Air Act in 1970 which set the US as one of the world leaders in environmental conservation. The world's first minister of the environment was the British Politician Peter Walker from the Conservative Party in 1970. The German "Benzinbleigesetz" reduced Tetraethyllead since 1972.

In the European Union, the very first Environmental Action Programme was adopted by national government representatives in July 1973 during the first meeting of the Council of Environmental Ministers. Since then an increasingly dense network of legislation has developed, which now extends to all areas of environmental protection including air pollution control, water protection and waste policy but also nature conservation and the control of chemicals, biotechnology and other industrial risks. EU environmental policy has thus become a core area of European politics. The German Umweltbundesamt was founded in Berlin 1974.

Overall organizations are becoming more aware of their environmental risks and performance requirements. In line with the ISO 14001 standard they are developing environmental policies suitable for their organization. This statement outlines environmental performance of the organization as well as its environmental objectives. Written by top management of the organization they document a commitment to continuous improvement and complying with legal and other requirements, such as the environmental policy objectives set by their governments.

Environmental policy integration 

The concept of environmental policy integration (EPI) refers to the process of integrating environmental objectives into non-environmental policy areas, such as energy, agriculture and transport, rather than leaving them to be pursued solely through purely environmental policy practices. This is oftentimes particularly challenging because of the need to reconcile global objectives and international rules with domestic needs and laws. EPI is widely recognised as one of the key elements of sustainable development. More recently, the notion of ‘climate policy integration’, also denoted as ‘mainstreaming’, has been applied to indicate the integration of climate considerations (both mitigation and adaptation) into the normal (often economically focused) activity of government.

Environmental policy studies

Given the growing need for trained environmental practitioners, graduate schools throughout the world offer specialized professional degrees in environmental policy studies. While there is not a standard curriculum, students typically take classes in policy analysis, environmental science, environmental law and politics, ecology, energy, and natural resource management. Graduates of these programs are employed by governments, international organizations, private sector, think tanks, advocacy organizations, universities, and so on.

Academic institutions use varying designations to refer to their environmental policy degrees.  The degrees typically fall in one of four broad categories: Master of Arts, Master of Science, master of public administration, and PhD. Sometimes, more specific names are used to reflect the focus of the academic program.

Notable institutions include the Balsillie School of International Affairs, SIPA at Columbia, Sciences Po Paris, Graduate Institute Geneva, University of Oxford, University of Warwick, and University of British Columbia, among others.

Environmental policy incentives 
Incentives for compliance with environmental policy is a way to encourage the population to be more sustainable. The article," Dynamic incentives by environmental policy instruments - a survey", covers that if the government can issue regulatory policies by virtue of administered prices (taxes), then this will be just as equivalent as companies issuing tradable permits. This means that if there is policies that directly tax unsustainable company practices, this will encourage them to become more sustainable and have them transition from tradable permits. 

Incentives can affect the decision to eco-innovate. The article,"The innovation effects of environmental policy instruments - A typical case of the blind mean and the elephant", mentions that based on studies made by Cleff and Rennings different environmental policy instruments in Germany, survey data noted that environmental policies encouraged many to eco-innovate. These studies revealed that if a population is faced with a policy that brings them a problem, they must adapt to the point where the policy isn't a problem. In this case, in Germany, environmental policies imposed taxes and regulations for waste, energy, etc. As a result, people changed their habits so that they wouldn't be taxed. Also, when there is incentives on the line, it is more beneficial to eco-innovate and benefit, rather than acquiring no incentive and still being taxed.

Effects of environmental policy 
Environmental policies can increase environmental sustainability when implemented. The article," British Columbia's revenue-neutral carbon tax: A review of the latest 'grand experiment' in environmental policy" states that in 2012 the effect of the gasoline sales tax in British Columbia caused a reduction in gasoline sales of 11% to 17%. What is obtained from this information is that people are willing to find alternatives in transportation in save money. This could mean that the implementation of stricter environmental policies, could draw higher percentages of sustainability.

Environmental policies promote can promote innovation in many different ways. The text," Content analysis of China's environmental policy instruments on promoting firms' environmental innovation",  China's environmental policy form promoted innovation through notices, measures, 'opinions', 'law', regulations, announcements, decisions, regulations, and rules. Pushing environmental policies in such ways can reach a population in many different ways. Like opinions brings the public voice into the matter, but regulation sets a standard for what needs to be done.

See also

 Chemical leasing
 Climate policy
 Environmental governance
 Environmental politics
 Environmental racism
 Environmental Racism in the United States
 Environmental Principles and Policies (book)
 Earth system governance
 Harris School of Public Policy Studies
 Normative science
 Tellus Institute
 Middlebury Institute of International Studies at Monterey
 Policy advocacy
 Population growth

References

External links
 GreenWill Global nonprofit initiative offering free environmental policies ("Green Policy") worldwide
 Envirowise UK Portal Government funded site offering environmental policy advice
 Responding to Climate Change Climate Change organization publishing annually since 2002.
 Resources for the Future A nonprofit and nonpartisan organization that conducts independent research—rooted primarily in economics and other social sciences—on environmental, energy, and natural resource issues.
 EEA/OECD Environmental Policy and Natural Resource Management database
 US National Environmental Policy Act
  
  In December 1997 Pakistan Environmental Protection Act (PEPA'97) was signed and promulgated by the President of Pakistan. It provides for the protection, conservation, rehabilitation and improvement of the environment, for the prevention and control of pollution, and promotion of sustainable development. PEPA'97 covers nearly all issues from pollution generation to pollution prevention, monitoring to confiscation, compliance to violation, and prosecution to penalization. However, results of this legislation are subjected to virtuous and unadulterated implementation.
Burden, L. 2010, How to write an environmental policy (for organizations), <http://www.environmentalpolicy.com.au/>

 
Environmental social science